The Armed Forces Provisional Ruling Council (AFPRC) gained control of Gambia in July 1994, in a military coup d'état. The AFPRC deposed the Dawda Jawara government and banned opposition political activity. Lieutenant Yahya Jammeh, chairman of the AFPRC, became head of state.  A few months later, Captain Sadibou Hydara, who was the spokesperson of the AFPRC, and Captain Sabali, deputy leader of the AFPRC, were accused by Jammeh of plotting a coup.  Both men were arrested and detained at the maximum prison.  Captain Hydara was tortured and killed in prison.  It was believed that Captain Hydara who was the most educated among the original members of the AFPRC was in favor of returning the country to civilian rule, and strongly objected to Jammeh's candidacy.

The AFPRC announced a transition plan for return to democratic civilian rule. The Provisional Independent Electoral Commission (PIEC) was established in 1996 to conduct national elections. The transition process included the compilation of a new electoral register; adoption of a new constitution by referendum in August of that year; presidential elections in September of that year and legislative elections in January 1997, respectively. Colonel Jammeh retired from the Army to run for president.  Jammeh won the elections and was sworn into office as President of the Gambia on November 6, 1996.

The PIEC was transformed into the Independent Electoral Commission on April 17, 1997; this commission deals with voter registration and the holding of elections and referendums.

References
 

History of the Gambia
Military history of the Gambia
Military dictatorships
Provisional governments